Aircraft railway station is located on the Werribee line in Victoria, Australia. It serves the western Melbourne suburb of Laverton, and opened on 7 March 1925 as Aviation Siding. It was renamed Aircraft Siding on 10 May 1927, and Aircraft on 19 March 1963.

The Western standard gauge line passes to the north of platform 1.

History
Aircraft station opened for passengers on 7 March 1926, and was provided to serve the former Royal Australian Air Force Laverton base. In the following year, on 10 May 1927, a platform was provided. On 10 May 1932, the station was relocated in the up direction.

In 1964, the station was rebuilt when it was relocated in the down direction, just beyond the former Aviation Road level crossing. In that year, flashing light signals were provided at the level crossing and, in 1968, in conjunction with the duplication of the railway line to Werribee, it was converted to an island platform. In 1979, boom barriers were provided at the level crossing.

Doubt was cast on the future of Aircraft station after the announcement that Williams Landing would be built just a kilometre down the line. In June 2010, a spokesman for then Public Transport Minister, Martin Pakula, said only that Aircraft would remain open until 2012, the opening date of Williams Landing. At the same time, the construction of 100 new car parking spaces was cancelled, and railway sources confirmed that the government's plans were to close Aircraft. However, in September 2010, the Public Transport Minister ended speculation by pledging that the station would not be closed.

In March 2018, it was announced by the Level Crossing Removal Project that the level crossing will be grade separated via a road over rail method, with the entrance of the station to be reconstructed. In September 2019, the level crossing was abolished.

In March 2022, a new pedestrian underpass opened at the up end of the station, replacing a pedestrian crossing. In April of that year, a new car park opened to the south of the station.

Platforms and services
Aircraft has one island platform with two faces. It is served by Werribee line trains.

Platform 1:
  all stations and limited express services to Flinders Street and Frankston

Platform 2:
  all stations services to Werribee

Transport links
CDC Melbourne operates three routes via Aircraft station, under contract to Public Transport Victoria:
 : Laverton station – Williamstown
 : Laverton station – Laverton station (loop service via Laverton North)
 : Laverton station – Sanctuary Lakes (Point Cook)

References

External links
 Melway map at street-directory.com.au

Railway stations in Melbourne
Railway stations in Australia opened in 1925
Railway stations in the City of Hobsons Bay